The Great Vermont Flood of 1927 was a major flooding event in Vermont which occurred November 2–4, 1927. Following a very wet October, record levels of rainfall fell in early November. The U.S. Geological Survey estimated 53% of the state received more than six inches of rain, (the greatest recorded amount being  in Somerset) which caused rivers throughout the state to flood. The flood is considered the worst flood in Vermont, with the only comparison being the 2011 Hurricane Irene floods.

Prelude

During the month of October, rainfall statewide averaged about 150 percent of normal, but in the northern and central sections of the state, some weather stations received 200–300 percent of normal. Heavy rainfall periods during the month were sufficiently separated that flooding did not occur, but the soil became saturated. Combined with the lateness of the year and the fact that most vegetation was either in, or near, seasonal dormancy, any further rainfall would run off directly into the rivers.

Flood 
Rain began to fall on the evening of November 2, as a cold front moved into the area from the west. Rainfall continued through the night with light amounts being recorded by the morning of the 3rd. Rainfall intensity increased during the morning of the 3rd as a low pressure center moved up along the Northeast coast. This low had abundant moisture associated with the remnants of a former tropical storm. As the low moved up the coast, a strong southeast air flow developed. This moisture-laden air was forced to rise as it encountered the Green Mountains, resulting in torrential downpours along and east of the mountains. Rainfall amounts at the Weather Bureau station in Northfield, for example, totaled  from 4 am to 11 am on the 3rd, with  falling from 11 am to 8 pm.

Aftermath

The flood destroyed 1285 bridges, killed at least 84 people, and destroyed many buildings and much infrastructure. Environmental historians attribute a number of possible causes for the extreme flooding, including deforestation, saturation of the soil, and the lack of living greenery because of the fall season.

The flood is seen as a turning point in relations between the state government and the governments of the towns.  Floodwaters destroyed many bridges which were the towns' responsibility to maintain and repair, but many towns lacked the resources to rebuild their bridges.  The state government undertook the task and in so doing assumed a larger role in the statewide road system.

The next year, President Calvin Coolidge (a native of Vermont) visited the state. He saw how Vermont had recovered from the flood and made a famous speech in Bennington in which he observed, “I love Vermont because of her hills and valleys, her scenery and invigorating climate, but most of all because of her indomitable people.” He went on to praise “the people of this brave little state of Vermont” for their endurance.

See also
Great Mississippi Flood of 1927
The Whisperer in Darkness, a novella by H. P. Lovecraft, begins with the Great Vermont Flood initiating the story's plot

References

Further reading

External links 
 Flood Photography from UVM as part of the Landscape change Project

Natural disasters in Vermont
Floods in the United States
1927 meteorology
1927 in Vermont
November 1927 events